George James Cowley-Brown, M.A. (1832–1924) was an Anglican clergyman and author who served in both the Church of England and the Scottish Episcopal Church.

Life
The eldest son of George Francis Brown, he was educated at Christ Church, Oxford, where awarded a Bachelor of Arts degree in 1854 and a Master of Arts degree in 1857.

He was ordained in the Anglican ministry as a deacon in 1855 and a priest in 1858. He served as a curate at Bladon-cum-Woodstock, Oxfordshire, 1855–1867; during which time he became domestic chaplain to the Duke of Marlborough in 1858. His next three appointments were Rector of Shipton-on-Cherwell, Oxfordshire, 1867–1874; Rector of Buckhorn-Weston, Dorset, 1874–77; and Rector of St Edmund's, Salisbury, Wiltshire, 1877–83. He became Rector of St John's, Edinburgh in 1883 and a canon of St Mary's Cathedral, Edinburgh in 1898. He retired in 1909. He lived at 9 Grosvenor Street in the western part of the city.

He married and had two sons: Horace Wyndham Cowley-Brown and John Stapleton Cowley-Brown, who both became authors.

Works 
He published a number of works:
 Lectures on the Gospel according to St. John (1863)
 A Short Apology for the Book of Common Prayer (1873)
 Daily Lessons on the Life of Our Lord, two volumes (1880)
 Prayers for a Household from Old Divines (1st edition 1881; 2nd edition 1897; 3rd edition 1907)
 Some Reason for Believing Christianity to be True (1897)
 Via Media (reprinted from the National Review) (1898)
  Verselets and Versions (1911)

Notes

References 
 

1832 births
Year of death unknown
19th-century English Anglican priests
20th-century Scottish Episcopalian priests
Alumni of Christ Church, Oxford